Navel fetishism, belly button fetishism, or alvinophilia is a partialism in which an individual is attracted to the human navel.

In 2012, it was the second most popular fetish search on Google as per their global monthly averages.

Stimuli

A navel fetishist can be sexually aroused by a variety of stimuli, including key words, thoughts or specific forms of physical interaction with the navel.

Physical activity
Some navel fetishists find physical acts involving the navel to be turn-ons. Physical acts can include licking the navel; applying body lotion or suntan oil; and pouring substances like champagne, honey, chocolate sauce or whipped cream into and around the navel and licking or sucking it up. Similarly, licking or rolling the tongue into the navel while underwater can produce erotic sensations, as can an ice cube when rubbed over or rested over the navel.

The navel region is an erogenous zone with heightened sensitivity that when touched by the finger or the tip of the tongue can produce erotic sensations. Individuals who are ticklish in that area can be aroused by tickling, blowing raspberries, or being  teased with a feather, flower, or blade of grass. Fingering the navel is also a common act.

Some prefer to perform navel torture, a series of pain-inflicting acts such as sucking or pulling the navel out (often with a syringe), dripping hot oil or wax into the navel, poking pins into the navel, and stabbing the navel.

This attention is usually directed at a partner's navel, but may include a fixation on the fetishist's own navel.

A sex worker in Turkey stated that some men have attempted to have sexual intercourse with her navel.

Viewing and fantasizing activity
Some navel fetishists can be aroused by viewing a navel. In the case of a heterosexual man, a woman in bikini or low-rise clothing like jeans, shorts etc., that reveals the navel is also considered sexually arousing. Indian journalist Bachi Karkaria once commented, "The navel is an erogenous zone. This is the reason why its exposure is always in fashion. Women have flashed it through the ages because men are turned on by it. It is shown because it wants to be seen".

Videos featuring above said physical acts are very common and are viewed worldwide. Their popularity has become more compared to regular porn videos.
Fetish model Wonderhussy stated in her blog that she had performed in belly button fetish videos in which she laid back and played with her belly button, poking her finger in it and stretching it out. Other models such as Elan Kane, Indica etc., have also featured in similar videos.

Belly dancers often have navel piercings or insert sequins into their navels to make it look attractive when they perform. Not only them, many young everyday women also have them to add a charm to their navels. Such decorations also arouse when seen.

Sometimes just the thought of the navel is enough to stimulate. Some navel fetishists sexually fantasize about the above physical acts on a person's navel to attain sexual pleasure.

Literature
Sometimes literary works focusing on navels or which sexually symbolize navels can also act as stimuli to navel fetishists. One such work is Navel Revue by author Jay Hahn-Lonne which is an autobiographical study of a man's obsession with navels. In the Song of Songs, a book in the Hebrew Bible, there are allusions to exotic things in nature, with frequent interweaving of nature with erotic imagery.  In Solomon's lavish praise of his love – the country girl, Sulaimi – the navel is mentioned as follows: "thy navel is like a round goblet, which wanteth not liquor: thy belly is like a heap of wheat set about with lilies." (7:2).

American poet May Swenson in her poem "Little Lion Face" wrote, "Now I'm bold to touch your swollen neck, put careful lips to slick petals, snuff up gold pollen in your navel cup." and poem "August Night" wrote, "Your navel a little pool in pulsing tide an aura round your knees".

Czech-born writer Milan Kundera in his 2015 book The Festival of Insignificance conveys about the eroticism of exposed female navels. Alain, one of the characters in the book, observes to his friend how most of the young women in Paris wear T-shirts or blouses that expose their midriffs, displaying their navels for all to see. The navel has become, in effect, the new locus of desire.

Robert W. Service in his short poem "Navels" wrote, "Men have navels more or less;....Woman's is a pearly ring,....So dear ladies, recognise The dimpling of your waist Has approval in my eyes,Favour in my taste......How a rosebud navel would Be sweet to kiss!" In Ancient Indian Sanskrit literature, writers like Adi Shankara, Kālidāsa etc., have symbolized and referred to the navel while describing the beauty of Hindu Goddesses.

Erotica

In 1970, the short-lived Belly Button Magazine, of which only two issues were recovered by The Kinsey Institute, featured descriptions of penetrative navel intercourse and images of sexual acts directed at navels.

Connections to other fetishes
Navel fetishism can co-exist with stomach fetishism (alvinolagnia) or sadomasochistic acts such as navel torture.
Navel intercourse is commonly linked to weight-related fetishes like BBW, feederism, and belly expansion.

Prevalence on the Internet

During the late nineties, there was a small but thriving online group of belly button fetish sites. These sites were maintained by individuals and usually hosted on third-party forum sites like ProBoards or InsideTheWeb. Each forum catered to a unique variation on the fetish, but were mostly the same in that they had individual boards for celebrity photos, candids, erotica, and personal stories. As the internet outgrew forums in favor of social networks and corporate porn sites, these sites began shutting down one by one. Subsequently, the site The Original Bellybutton Forum (OBF) became popular but got shut down due to admin-related problems. It reconvened with the name BellyLove but met the same fate as OBF.

See also 

 Alvinolagnia
 Belly dance
 Clothing
 Bikini
 Crop top
 Low-rise jeans
 Midriff
 Navel in popular culture
 Navel piercing
 Partialism
 Omphalomancy
 Umbilicoplasty

References

Paraphilias
Sexual fetishism
Navel